David Andrew Miller (born 10 June 1989) is a South African professional cricketer. He currently plays for KwaZulu-Natal and the South African national team in Limited overs cricket. He is an aggressive left-handed middle order batsman and an occasional wicket-keeper.

He plays domestic cricket for the Dolphins and Playing for Multan Sultan in Pakistan super League and he is the former captain of Kings XI Punjab in the Indian Premier League and plays for the South Africa national cricket team in both One Day International (ODI) and Twenty20 International cricket. In September 2018, Miller announced that he would no longer be available to play first-class cricket.

Domestic career
Miller made his first-class debut in the Dolphins' final game of the 2007–08 domestic SuperSport Series, scoring a half-century in the first innings in which he batted.

Miller made eight appearances in the one-day MTN Domestic Championship competition of the same season, though his final match was abandoned after just three overs. Miller scored an average of 13 runs throughout the competition, which saw the Dolphins finish in fifth place in the league.

Miller played two matches in the Pro20 Series Twenty20 competition for the Dolphins, who finished as defeated finalists in the competition.

In May 2018, Miller was named as one of the ten marquee players for the first edition of the Global T20 Canada cricket tournament. On 3 June 2018, he was selected to play for the Winnipeg Hawks in the players' draft for the inaugural edition of the tournament.

In October 2018, Miller was named in Durban Heat's squad for the first edition of the Mzansi Super League T20 tournament. In September 2019, he was named in the squad for the Durban Heat team for the 2019 Mzansi Super League tournament. In April 2021, he was named in KwaZulu-Natal's squad, ahead of the 2021–22 cricket season in South Africa.

T20 franchise cricket

Indian Premier League
In the 2013 IPL auction, Kings XI Punjab bought Miller for ₨ 6 crore. He went on to play all the matches for his team that season. On 6 May 2013, Miller hit the third fastest hundred in IPL history. He scored 101 not out off 38 balls whilst chasing against Royal Challengers Bangalore at the IS Bindra Stadium, Mohali. The opposing captain Virat Kohli, who dropped a catch when Miller was on 41, said of the innings that it was one of the best innings he had ever seen in the Indian Premier League history. He was retained by Kings XI Punjab for 2014 IPL where he played all matches and help his team to reach the finals. It was announced that he will be the captain of the Kings XI Punjab for 2016 IPL.

During IPL 2015, during the match between Kolkata Knight Riders and Kings XI Punjab at Eden Gardens on 9 May 2015, a policeman was left with his left eye blind after the ball hit for a six by struck his eye.

Miller was released by the Kings XI Punjab ahead of the 2020 IPL auction. In the 2020 IPL auction, he was bought by the Rajasthan Royals ahead of the 2020 Indian Premier League. In February 2022, he was bought by the Gujarat Titans in the auction for the 2022 Indian Premier League tournament. He scored 481 runs at average of 68.71 in IPL 2022 for Gujarat titans which helped them to win their first title.

Other leagues
In October 2020, Miller was drafted by the Dambulla Hawks for the inaugural edition of the Lanka Premier League. In June 2021, it was announced that Miller will be playing for Peshawar Zalmi in PSL 6. In April 2022, he was bought by the Welsh Fire for the 2022 season of The Hundred in England. In July 2022 Miller named as captain of Barbados Royals in CPL for 2022 edition.

International career
Miller earned his national call up in May 2010 after a series for South Africa A against Bangladesh A, where he ended as the second-highest run-scorer. Miller made his Twenty20 International debut for South Africa on 20 May 2010 against the West Indies in Antigua. Miller, called up to replace the injured Jacques Kallis, dispatched the sixth ball of his innings for six and went on to top score as South Africa won by just 1 run. Two days later, Miller made his ODI debut, also against the West Indies. He put in another good performance, scoring 23 not out and helping South Africa to win. Miller was selected to play in Zimbabwe's tour of South Africa, during which he contributed in both ODI and T20 formats towards a resounding victory by the South Africans. He was then selected for the South African squad to play Pakistan in the U.A.E. during October and November 2010. He played in two ODI series, against West Indies and Pakistan, before being named in South Africa preliminary 2011 World Cup squad.

On 15 October 2010, Miller made his maiden ODI fifty against Zimbabwe and South Africa went on to put a massive total of 351.

In the semi-finals of the 2013 ICC Champions Trophy, Miller along with Rory Kleinveldt set the record for the highest 9th wicket partnership in ICC Champions Trophy history, with 95.

Miller made his Maiden One Day International century in the 4th ODI against the West Indies on 25 January 2015.

In August 2017, Miller was named in a World XI side to play three Twenty20 International matches against Pakistan in the 2017 Independence Cup in Lahore.

2015 Cricket World Cup
Miller was one of South Africa's top performers at the 2015 Cricket World Cup scoring 324 runs at an average of 65 and strike rate of 139 during the tournament.

Miller scored 49 off 18 balls in the semi final, although his effort was in vain as New Zealand won the match.

During that World Cup, Miller along with JP Duminy set the record for the highest 5th wicket partnership in ODI history as well as World Cup history (256*).

2017–present
On 15 October 2017, Miller played in his 100th ODI and became the third player after Rohit Sharma and Kieron Pollard to play 100 ODIs without featuring in a Test match. In the 2nd T20I of the same tour, he scored his first century in a T20I and made the fastest century in a T20I (35 balls). He was also the first player to score a T20I century batting at number five or lower. During the match, he became fifth player from South Africa to score 1,000 runs in T20Is.

During the Pakistan series in February 2019, regular captain Faf du Plessis was rested for the last two T20Is of the series, with Miller named as captain of South Africa in his place.

In April 2019, Miller was named in South Africa's squad for the 2019 Cricket World Cup. On 19 June 2019, in the match against New Zealand, Miller scored his 3,000th run in ODIs. In September 2021, Miller was named in South Africa's squad for the 2021 ICC Men's T20 World Cup.
On the South Africa Tour of India in 2022, he was dominating the game against New Team India. For South Africa's tour of England in 2022, David Miller has been selected as New Captain for T20 series. In October 2022, He scored his 2nd T20I Century again India at the Dr. Bhupen Hazarika Cricket Stadium, Barsapara, Assam .

Miller was named in the ICC Men's T20I Team of the Year in 2021.

Notes

References

External links
 

1989 births
Living people
Cricketers from Pietermaritzburg
South African cricketers
South Africa One Day International cricketers
South Africa Twenty20 International cricketers
Dolphins cricketers
KwaZulu-Natal cricketers
Durham cricketers
Punjab Kings cricketers
South African people of British descent
Yorkshire cricketers
Alumni of Maritzburg College
Cricketers at the 2015 Cricket World Cup
Cricketers at the 2019 Cricket World Cup
Chattogram Challengers cricketers
Saint Lucia Kings cricketers
Knights cricketers
Glamorgan cricketers
World XI Twenty20 International cricketers
Jamaica Tallawahs cricketers
Durban Heat cricketers
Hobart Hurricanes cricketers
Rajasthan Royals cricketers
Peshawar Zalmi cricketers
Gujarat Titans cricketers
Welsh Fire cricketers